Miguel Anthony Jimenez (born August 19, 1969 in New York, New York) is a former Major League Baseball pitcher. He batted and threw right-handed.

External links

1969 births
Living people
Baseball players from New York (state)
Fordham Rams baseball players
Oakland Athletics players
Zion Pioneerzz players
American expatriate baseball players in Canada
American expatriate baseball players in Taiwan
Edmonton Trappers players
Huntsville Stars players
Iowa Cubs players
Madison Muskies players
Modesto A's players
Southern Oregon A's players
Tacoma Tigers players
Uni-President Lions players
West Tennessee Diamond Jaxx players